United Nations Security Council Resolution 63, adopted on December 24, 1948, in response to a report by the Committee of Good Offices the Council called upon the parties to cease hostilities and to release the President of the Republic of Indonesia and other political prisoners arrested since December 18, 1948.

The council further instructed the Committee to report to it fully and urgently by telegraph on the events which have transpired since December 12, 1948 and to report to the Council on the compliance of the involved parties to its demands.

The resolution was adopted by seven votes to none; Belgium, France, the Ukrainian SSR and Soviet Union abstained.

See also
Indonesian National Revolution
List of United Nations Security Council Resolutions 1 to 100 (1946–1953)
United Nations Security Council Resolution 64

References
Text of the Resolution at undocs.org

External links
 

 0063
Indonesian National Revolution
 0063
 0063
1948 in Indonesia
December 1948 events